The firefinches form a genus, Lagonosticta, of small seed-eating African birds in the family Estrildidae.

The genus was introduced by the German ornithologists Jean Cabanis in 1851. The type species was subsequently designated as the African firefinch. The name combines the Ancient Greek words lagōn "flank" and stiktos "spotted". The genus Lagonosticta is sister to the brown twinspot which is placed in its own genus Clytospiza.

Species
The genus contains 10 species:

References

 
Finches
 
Taxonomy articles created by Polbot